WOHZ-CD (channels 19 and 43) is a low-power, Class A television station in Canton, Ohio, United States. Owned by Gray Television, it serves as an ultra high frequency (UHF) translator of Gray's two full-power stations in the Cleveland market: WOIO (channel 19), a Shaker Heights–licensed CBS affiliate, and WUAB (channel 43), a Lorain–licensed CW affiliate, both of which broadcast over the same spectrum via a channel sharing agreement.

WOHZ-CD's transmitter is located northeast of Canton, while WOIO and WUAB share studios on the ground floor of the Reserve Square building in Downtown Cleveland.

History 
Originally licensed to Mansfield, Ohio, this station took to the air on May 7, 1990, as W50BE. An extension of locally owned WVNO-FM and WRGM, W50BE was an independent station boasting a lineup of local newscasts and community programming for the Mansfield/Ashland/Bucyrus region, nearly equidistant from both the Cleveland and Columbus markets. After W50BE owner Mid-State Television, Inc., headed by Robert Meisse, acquired the license to WCOM-TV, that station was relaunched as WMFD-TV "TV68/50" on June 1, 1992, simulcasting W50BE's programming.

By the beginning of 1996, W50BE changed call signs to WOHZ-LP and was relaunched as "Z-50", offering additional local programming as a WMFD-TV extension alongside America One fare. Later upgraded to a Class A station as WOHZ-CA, it also began to offer weather information and an audio simulcast of WVNO-FM from a combined studio facility in Ontario, Ohio. The station was licensed for digital operation on February 26, 2015, assuming the call sign WOHZ-CD.

On October 8, 2020, Mid-State Television sold WOHZ-CD to Atlanta–based Gray Television, owner of WOIO and WUAB, for $450,000. The sale was completed on December 8, 2020. Upon taking over WOHZ-CD, Gray Television changed the station's city of license to Canton, Ohio, and began using it as a repeater for WOIO and WUAB, increasing coverage for the two stations in the southern part of the Cleveland/Northeast Ohio TV market.

Subchannels 
The station's digital signal is multiplexed:

See also 
Tallest structures in the United States, relating to the old WCOM tower.

References 

Television channels and stations established in 1990
Low-power television stations in the United States
CBS network affiliates
The CW affiliates
OHZ-CD
1990 establishments in Ohio
Canton, Ohio
Gray Television